Antonio Santurro Bueno (born 29 February 1992) is a professional footballer who plays as a goalkeeper for  club Parma. Born in Italy, he plays for the Dominican Republic national team.

Club career
Born in Parma, Emilia-Romagna region to a father from Frosinone and a Dominican mother, Santurro started his career at the youth teams of Parma F.C. He was a player for their U-16 team in Emilia-Romagna's "Allievi" League in 2007–08 season. He played six games in Campionato Nazionale Primavera (Italian under-20 league) from 2009 to 2011 for Parma's reserves. In 2011 he was transferred to Serie D club Bagnolese.

In 2012 he was signed by Lega Pro Seconda Divisione club Renate on loan. In 2013 the contract was extended. In 2014 he left for Lega Pro club Savoia. Circa January 2015 he was loaned to Juve Stabia.

In 2015 he was signed by Melfi. In 2016 he left for another third-tier club Siracusa. The club entered the promotion play-off in 2017, losing to Casertana in the first stage. He was the starting keeper of the team, only missing once due to suspension.

On 11 July 2017, Santurro was signed by Serie A club Bologna. He was recommended by Luca Bucci, goalkeeping coach of Bologna and former coach of Parma youth team. He made his debut for Bologna at home against Roma on 31 March 2018.

On 8 July 2019, Santurro joined to Sambenedettese on loan until 30 June 2020.

On 18 September 2020, he went to Catania on loan.

On 3 October 2021. he went to Udinese.

On 1 November 2022, Santurro returned to Parma.

International career
On 20 May 2022, Santurro received his first call up to the Dominican Republic national football team. He debuted with the Dominican Republic in a 3–2 CONCACAF Nations League loss to French Guiana on 5 June 2022, coming on as a substitute in the 67th minute.

Personal life
He has a twin brother Riccardo, a former youth footballer of Inter Club Parma and Vicenza Calcio. Due to his Dominican background, his favorite music genres are reggaeton and bachata.

References

External links
 AIC profile (data by football.it) 

1992 births
Living people
Sportspeople from Parma
Footballers from Emilia-Romagna
Dominican Republic footballers
Dominican Republic international footballers
Italian footballers
Dominican Republic people of Italian descent
Italian people of Dominican Republic descent
Citizens of the Dominican Republic through descent
Association football goalkeepers
Sportspeople of Italian descent
Twin sportspeople
Parma Calcio 1913 players
A.C. Renate players
A.C. Savoia 1908 players
S.S. Juve Stabia players
A.S. Melfi players
Bologna F.C. 1909 players
A.S. Sambenedettese players
Catania S.S.D. players
Udinese Calcio players
Serie A players
Serie C players
Serie D players
Italian twins
Sportspeople of Dominican Republic descent